Snipes may refer to:

 Snipe, a wading bird
 Snipes (surname)
 Snipes (film), a 2001 film
 Snipes (video game), a 1983 text-mode networked computer game
 Snipes Mountain AVA, a wine region in Washington State

See also 

 Snipe (disambiguation)
 Sniper (disambiguation)